Bandi Attai Khan (also known as Banda Attai Khan) is one of the 51 union councils of Abbottabad District in Khyber-Pakhtunkhwa province of Pakistan.

References

Union councils of Abbottabad District

fr:Tehsil d'Havelian
simple:Bandi Attai Khan